The X-35 was designed by X-Yachts Design Team led by Niels Jeppesen and first launched in 2006. The class is recognised by the International Sailing Federation.

Events

World Championships

References

External links
 Official X-35 Class Association Website
 Official X-Yachts Website
  World Sailing X35 Microsite Website

Classes of World Sailing
Sailing yachts
2000s sailboat type designs
Sailboat type designs by Niels Jeppesen
Sailboat types built by x yachts